Nalugu Stambhalata is a 1982 Telugu-language romantic drama film directed by Jandhyala starring Naresh, Poornima, Pradeep Kondiparthi, and Tulasi. The music was composed by Rajan–Nagendra. V. B. Rajendra Prasad remade the film in Hindi as Bekaraar in 1983.

Cast 
 Naresh
 Poornima
 Pradeep Kondiparthi
 Tulasi
 Suthivelu
 Suthi Veerabhadra Rao

Music 
The music for this film was composed by Rajan–Nagendra. The song Chinukula Rali was reused from music director's own composition  Kanasalu Neene Manasalu Neene from the 1976 Kannada movie Bayalu Daari.

References

External links  
 
 Nalugu Stambhalata full movie on Youtube

Indian romantic drama films
Films directed by Jandhyala
Films scored by Rajan–Nagendra
Telugu films remade in other languages
1980s Telugu-language films
1982 romantic drama films
1982 films